The Irish Homestead was the weekly publication of the Irish Agricultural Organisation Society (IAOS). It was founded in 1895 by Horace Plunkett.

History
The aim of the paper was to publicise and propagate the objectives of the IAOS, which set up dairy co-operative societies and co-operative banks, and introduced co-operation among Irish farmers by proving the benefits obtainable through more economical and efficient management. Its headquarters were initially in the IAOS building in Dublin, 84 Merrion Square. The newspaper's first editor was Thomas A. Finlay, followed by T. P. Gill and H. F. Norman. In 1905, George William Russell became editor. A major contributor of articles and essays was Susan L. Mitchell, who became assistant editor. It was the first publication to publish James Joyce, with his short story "The Sisters" in 1904.

It ceased publication in 1918, but was afterwards revived in October 1921. In 1923 it was amalgamated with the Irish Statesman, and in this format it continued, under the editorship of George William Russell, until 1930.

Further reading

References and sources

Notes

Sources
Barbara Hayley and Enda McKay (ed.), Three Hundred Years of Irish Periodicals, Dublin : Lilliput Press,  1987

Mass media in Dublin (city)
Weekly newspapers published in Ireland
Publications established in 1895
Publications disestablished in 1918
Defunct newspapers published in Ireland
1918 disestablishments in Ireland